"Citrimicrobium" is a Gram-negative, pleomorphic and motile bacteria genus from the family Erythrobacteraceae with one known species ("Citrimicrobium luteum"). Citrimicrobium luteum has been isolated from the gut of the sea cucumber Stichopus japonicus from the Jeju Island in Korea.

References

Sphingomonadales
Bacteria genera
Monotypic bacteria genera
Taxa described in 2014